Porullo is a village in the state of Guanajuato, Mexico. The land area of Porullo is about  With 715 inhabitants.

Population 
Those born in Porullo tend to emigrate as young adults and live elsewhere (primarily Illinois, California, Florida, and Texas) but often return in the month of December, due to Christmas festivities, weddings and Quinceañera parties planned around this time of the year.

References

Populated places in Guanajuato
Yuriria